Cantuar is an unincorporated community in Rural Municipality of Swift Current No. 137, Saskatchewan, Canada. The site is still used as a freight station by the Great Sandhills Railway.

See also 

 List of communities in Saskatchewan
 List of hamlets in Saskatchewan
 Lists of ghost towns in Canada
 List of ghost towns in Saskatchewan

References

Swift Current No. 137, Saskatchewan
Unincorporated communities in Saskatchewan
Ghost towns in Saskatchewan